Peter Wiafe Pepera (born May 9, 1954) was a Ghanaian politician and a former Member of Parliament of Abetifi constituency in the Eastern Region of Ghana. He was a member of the New Patriotic Party of Ghana. He was succeeded by Bryan Acheampong.

Early life and education 
Pepera was born on May 9, 1954. He hailed from Abetifi, a town in the Eastern Region of Ghana. He was an alumnus of the University of Birmingham, UK and obtained his Master of Science degree in systems engineering in 1980.

Career 
He worked as managing director for Paramount Distilleries. He served as Member of Parliament from January 2009 till he died on 21 May 2016.

Politics 
He was a member of the National Democratic Congress in the 1990s until he defected to the New Patriotic Party in the 2000s. Whilst in the NDC, He served as deputy Minister of Trade and Industry under the Rawlings government.

Pepera was a member of the New Patriotic Party (NPP). He represented Abetifi Constituency in the 5th parliament of Ghana. In 2012, he contested for re-election into the  Abetifi parliamentary office on the ticket of the NPP to represent in the sixth parliament of the fourth republic and he won. He was a member of the Committee of Privileges, House, Trade, Industry and Tourism

Personal life 
Pepera identified as a Christian and a Jedi.

Death 
He died while on admission at the 37 military hospital in Accra after a short illness, aged 62

References

New Patriotic Party politicians
Ghanaian MPs 2013–2017
Ghanaian Roman Catholics
People from Eastern Region (Ghana)
2016 deaths
Ghanaian MPs 2009–2013
1954 births